Pasadena Now (2004–present) is an online magazine first published in April 2004 by James Macpherson and Candice Merrill, its co-publisher.  Pasadena Now was established by James Macpherson and Candice Merrill in 2004 to serve the Pasadena, California-area community as an online source of news, information, and entertainment. Macpherson is the magazine's editor and publisher, and Merill is the magazine's Events Editor and Chief Photographer.

Stance
Pasadena Now began by reporting on local news, musical events, restaurant reviews, etc. within Pasadena, California in 2004 and within three years had expanded to cover most topics covered in a typical local newspaper.  For his work on the magazine, Macpherson has been called a pioneer of “glocal” news by US newspaper columnists. One of Macpherson's goals is to be able to cover smaller, local events in depth that larger newspapers can no longer afford to do.

MacPherson has said that one of the main benefits of Pasadena Now is that, as a single online source, it is more environmentally friendly regular sources for local information like yellow pages and print newspapers. All the news, including city government, public safety, public & private K-12 and college education, lifestyle, science, technology, event listings, local sports, business and opinion are covered.

On April 11, 2015, Pasadena Now launched Altadena Now, a community news website for Altadena, covering the community news and information that cannot be found on a daily or a weekly newspaper. Also, Pasadena Sports Now was launched on August 22, 2016. It will have Pasadena area public and private high school sports news and scheduled events along with Pasadena City College and Caltech sporting events as well. Pasadena Now also has a Spanish-language website called Pasadena Hoy with coverage in Spanish.

International reporters
In 2007, Pasadena Now hired two journalists in India to cover local Pasadena news. Macpherson argued that due to the availability of information online (such as city council sessions) that it is possible for local coverage to be done by people in other countries for significantly lower wages.  The decision was criticized by several professors of journalism, including Rob Gunnison at the UC Berkeley Graduate School of Journalism and Bryce Nelson at USC.

References

External links

Online magazines published in the United States
Mass media in Pasadena, California
Magazines established in 2004
Local interest magazines published in the United States
Magazines published in California